Fred C. Whiting (born December 14, 1938) is an American former politician. He served in the South Dakota House of Representatives from 1993 to 1994 and in the Senate from 1995 to 2002.

References

1938 births
Living people
Republican Party members of the South Dakota House of Representatives
Republican Party South Dakota state senators